Nevenko Valčić (1 January 1933 – 3 February 2007) was a Yugoslav cyclist. He competed in the individual road race and team time trial events at the 1960 Summer Olympics.

References

External links
 

1933 births
2007 deaths
People from Marčana
Yugoslav male cyclists
Olympic cyclists of Yugoslavia
Cyclists at the 1960 Summer Olympics